The  is a five-axle C-B wheel arrangement diesel-hydraulic shunting locomotive type operated in Japan since 1968.

Variants
A total of 116 locomotives were built between 1968 and 1979, divided into the following sub-classes.
 Class DE11-0: 65 locomotives built between 1968 and 1970
 Class DE11-1000: 46 locomotives built between 1970 and 1974 with uprated engines
 Class DE11-1900: One locomotive built in 1975 with experimental noise-reduction features
 Class DE11-2000: 4 locomotives built in 1979 with noise-reduction features

Design
The Class DE11 was developed from the Class DE10 locomotive design, with the train-heating steam generator and multiple-working equipment removed and replaced with concrete ballast weight to increase the axle load from 13 t to 14 t to improve adhesion for use in shunting work.

History

DE11-0

65 locomotives were built between 1968 and 1970.

DE11-1000

Locomotives DE11 1030, 1032, 1035, and 1046 were fitted with "SLC" (Shunting Locomotive Control) equipment to allow remote control at Musashino Marshalling Yard in Saitama Prefecture.

DE11-1900
One locomotive, numbered DE11 1901, was built in 1975, experimentally incorporating a number of features to reduce external noise for use in yards close to residential areas. Features included additional sound-insulating around the engine compartment and a noise reduction unit on the exhaust chimney.

DE11 1901 was withdrawn in 2000.

DE11-2000
Four Class DE11-2000 locomotives, numbered DE11 2001 to 2004 were built in 1979, incorporating some of the noise-reduction features tried out on DE11 1901. These locomotives also feature skirting to reduce noise.

Fleet status
By 1 April 1995, 14 locomotives were still in service, with ten (nine DE11-1000 and DE11 1901) operated by East Japan Railway Company (JR East) and four (DE11-2000) operated by Japan Freight Railway Company (JR Freight)

, 10 locomotives remain in service, with three (DE11-1000) operated by JR East and seven (three DE11-1000 and four DE11-2000) operated by JR Freight.

Classification

The DE11 classification for this locomotive type is explained below.
 D: Diesel locomotive
 E: Five driving axles
 11: Locomotive with maximum speed of 85 km/h or less

References

Diesel locomotives of Japan
DE11
DE11
C-B locomotives
1067 mm gauge locomotives of Japan
Railway locomotives introduced in 1968
Kawasaki diesel locomotives
Nippon Sharyo locomotives